Matías Carrillo García (born 24 February 1963 in Macapule, Sinaloa, México) is a Mexican professional baseball manager and former outfielder. He played for three seasons in the Major League Baseball, making his debut in 1991 for the Milwaukee Brewers and was member of the Florida Marlins in the 1993 and 1994 seasons.

Professional career
During his career, Carrillo played for 22 seasons in the Mexican League. He debuted in 1982 for the Petroleros de Poza Rica, winning the Rookie of the Year Award. In 1984, Carrillo was signed by the Tigres Capitalinos.

After spending three seasons with the Denver Zephyrs, Carrillo made his MLB debut on 23 May 1991 playing for the Milwaukee Brewers.

In 1993, Carrillo was signed by the Florida Marlins and played his last MLB game on 10 August 1994.

In 1995, Carrillo returned to the Mexican League, where he played for the Tigres until his retirement in 2009. He also played winter baseball in the Mexican Pacific League for the Cañeros de Los Mochis.

After his retirement on 26 July 2009, Tigres de Quintana Roo retired his uniform number 24.

In 2020, Carrillo was inducted into the Mexican Professional Baseball Hall of Fame.

Managing career
From 2009 to 2013, Carrillo managed the Tigres de Quintana Roo of the Mexican Baseball League, winning the Manager of the Year Award in 2011.

In July 2013, he joined Leones de Yucatán as manager.

On 11 May 2015, Carillo became the manager of the Pericos de Puebla; he was replaced by Cory Snyder in June 2016.

On 31 May 2022, he was appointed as manager of the Acereros de Monclova, replacing Mickey Callaway. He was not retained following the season.

He was named manager of El Águila de Veracruz for the 2023 season.

References

External links

Mexican Baseball League stats and bio Matías Carrillo

1963 births
Living people
Baseball players from Sinaloa
Caribbean Series managers
Denver Zephyrs players
El Paso Diablos players
Florida Marlins players
Major League Baseball outfielders
Major League Baseball players from Mexico
Mexican Baseball Hall of Fame inductees
Mexican expatriate baseball players in the United States
Mexican League baseball managers
Mexican League baseball center fielders
Mexican League baseball right fielders
Milwaukee Brewers players
Nashua Pirates players
Petroleros de Poza Rica players
Salem Buccaneers players
Tigres de la Angelopolis players
Tigres de Quintana Roo players
Tigres del México players